The R598 road is a regional road in Ireland which links various villages, including Rathbarry and Owenahincha with the N71 road in County Cork.

See also 

 Roads in Ireland
 National primary road
 National secondary road

References 

Regional roads in the Republic of Ireland

Roads in County Cork